The year 2012 was the 41st year after the independence of Bangladesh. It was also the fourth year of the second term of the Government of Sheikh Hasina.

Incumbents

 President: Zillur Rahman
 Prime Minister: Sheikh Hasina
 Chief Justice: Md. Muzammel Hossain.

Demography

Climate

Flood and landslides
Floods and landslides caused by heavy rain starting from 23 June significantly affected ten districts in the country's northern and south-eastern parts, including the districts of Bandarban, Cox's Bazar, Chittagong, Sylhet, Sunamganj, Kurigram, Gaibandha and Jamalpur. Official statistics as of 31 July reported 131 deaths.

Economy

Note: For the year 2012 average official exchange rate for BDT was 81.86 per US$.

Events

 18 January – Bangladesh Army claimed to have foiled a coup d'état attempt.
 9 February – President of Bangladesh Zillur Rahman launched the first session of Bangladesh Premier League during an opening ceremony held at the Sher-e-Bangla Cricket Stadium in Dhaka.
 11 February – Two well-known, married Bangladeshi journalists, named Sagar Sarowar and Meherun Runi, were stabbed to death for a yet to be determined motive in their Dhaka apartment.
 13 March – A double decker ferry capsized after colliding with a cargo ship on Meghna River, killing at least 110 people.
 5 April – Dead body of trade unionist Aminul Islam was recovered from a road near Ghatail. Islam's murder is still unsolved, but his case gained international attention from AFL–CIO and the US State Department.
 20 October - Indian photographer Robin Sengupta is awarded  " Friend of Liberation " medal.
 24 November – A fire at the Tazreen Fashion factory in the Ashulia region on the outskirts of Dhaka, killed at least 117 people.
 24 November – Three steel girders of a flyover  collapsed in the suburb of Bahaddarhat in Chittagong, killing at least 13 people and injuring around 50.
 9 December – A 24-year-old tailor in Dhaka, named Biswajit Das, was murdered by members of the Bangladesh Chhatra League (BCL), the student wing of the governing Awami League party.

Awards and recognitions

International Recognition
 Syeda Rizwana Hasan, a lawyer promoting environment protection, was awarded Ramon Magsaysay Award.

Independence Day Award

Ekushey Padak
 Humayun Azad, language and literature (posthumous)
 Mubinul Azim, fine arts (posthumous)
 Mumtaz Begum, Language Movement (posthumous)
 Baren Chakraborthi, science and technology
 Ehtesham Haydar Chowdhury, journalism (posthumous)
 Karunamoy Goswami, fine arts
 Enamul Haque, fine arts
 A.K. Nazmul Karim, education (posthumous)
 Monsur Alam Khan, education
 Suddhananda Mahathero, social work
 Tareque Masud, fine arts (posthumous)
 Habibur Rahman Milon (journalism)
 Ashfaque Munier, journalism (posthumous)
 Mamunur Rashid, fine arts
 Ajoy Kumar Roy, education

Sports
 Olympics:
 Bangladesh sent a delegation to compete in the 2012 Summer Olympics in London, United Kingdom. Bangladesh did not win any medals in the competition.
 Football:
 Dhaka Abahani Limited won the Premier League.
 Cricket:
 Dhaka Gladiators won the inaugural edition of BPL.
 In March, Bangladesh hosted the 2012 Asia Cup which featured the four Test-playing nations from Asia: Bangladesh, India, Pakistan and Sri Lanka. Pakistan won the tournament by beating Bangladesh in the final by 2 runs.
 The West Indies cricket team toured Bangladesh in November and December. The tour consisted of two Test matches, five One Day Internationals and one Twenty20 match. West Indies won both Test matches and the Twenty20 while Bangladesh won the ODI series 3–2.

Deaths

 31 January – Siddika Kabir, nutritionist, cook (b. 1931)
 13 February – Humayun Faridi, actor (b. 1952)
 9 May – Chinghla Mong Chowdhury Mari, footballer (b. 1938)
 20 May – Sultana Zaman, actor (b. 1935)
 9 July – Humayun Ahmed, writer and filmmaker (b. 1948)
 15 July – Muzharul Islam, architect (b. 1923)
 10 September – Muslehuddin Ahmad, educationist, diplomat (b. 1930s)
 26 September – Ataus Samad, journalist (b. 1936)
 8 October – Bidit Lal Das, folk singer, composer (b. 1938)
 29 November – Bijon Sarkar, photographer (b. 1935)
 8 December – Khan Sarwar Murshid, educationist, diplomat (b. 1924)
 10 December – Iajuddin Ahmed, 13th President of Bangladesh (b. 1931)

See also 
 2010s in Bangladesh
 List of Bangladeshi films of 2012
 2011–12 Bangladeshi cricket season
 2012–13 Bangladeshi cricket season
 Timeline of Bangladeshi history

References